Félix de Jesus Araujo Razo (born 10 February 1983), is a Mexican former footballer who played as a defender.

Career
Araujo made his official Liga MX debut for Toluca in July 2011.

In his youth career with Cruz Azul, Araujo was never able to break through to the senior team and only played for the second tier reserves squads: Cruz Azul Oaxaca and Cruz Azul Hidalgo . In January 2008, he went to Paraguay to play for local team Club 2 de Mayo, where he spent the next six months without much success. He later returned to his homeland, where he played for the second division teams Lobos BUAP and C.F. La Piedad.

His younger brother, Néstor, is also a defender, who currently plays for Celta de Vigo.

After the relegation and dissolution of Jaguares de Chiapas, Araujo, along with some of his other Chiapas teammates, joined fellow chiapas team Cafetaleros de Tapachula for the upcoming 2017-2018 Ascenso Mx season.

Honours
Cafetaleros de Tapachula
 Ascenso MX: Clausura 2018

References

External links

1983 births
Living people
Mexican footballers
Mexican expatriate footballers
Lobos BUAP footballers
La Piedad footballers
Deportivo Toluca F.C. players
San Luis F.C. players
Cruz Azul footballers
Chiapas F.C. footballers
Leones Negros UdeG footballers
2 de Mayo footballers
Cafetaleros de Chiapas footballers
Liga MX players
Paraguayan Primera División players
Expatriate footballers in Paraguay
Footballers from Guadalajara, Jalisco
Association football defenders